Eugène Pechaubes (24 June 1890 – 2 February 1967) was a French painter. His work was part of the painting event in the art competition at the 1932 Summer Olympics.

References

1890 births
1967 deaths
20th-century French painters
20th-century French male artists
French male painters
Olympic competitors in art competitions
People from Pantin